Saint Macculind (or Macallan, MacCuilinn, Macculin Dus, Maculinus; died c. 496) was an early Irish saint who was abbot or bishop of Lusk.

Life

John O'Hanlon notes in his Lives of the Irish saints (1873), "Much confusion exists in the documents and traditions which remain, regarding the time when the patron saint of Lusk flourished...".
The O'Clerys claim that he was descended from the race of Tadhg, son to Cian, son of Oilill Olum, King of Munster (died 234).
Some writers say the saint was the son of Cathmoga or Cathbad, but based on his name his father was probably a man named Cullin.
His first name was said to be Cainnigh, Caindigh or Caindedh.

Macculind did much to found churches and monasteries.
He left Leinster to become a disciple of Saint Gregory in the district of "Carbrinum", under whom he studied theology and scripture.
He is reported to have worked various miracles, both in Ireland and during a visit to Scotland.
He is also said to have visited Rome, where Pope Gregory made him a bishop and then directed him to return to his province.
He went to a town named Durpconyle, where he founded a monastery, and he also founded a monastery named Albamene, and is said to have founded twelve monasteries in all.

At some point Macculind became bishop of Lusk.
The Martyrology of Denegal associates MacCuillinn of Lusk with Odrhan of Lettrock as telling Claran his life would be cut short.
The Acts of S. Maculin of Lusk, preserved in Trinity College Dublin, state "that he visited Scotland twice, and was in repute there."
Alban Butler cites Colgan's manuscript in stating that St. Macculindus, bishop of Lusk, died in 497 and is commemorated on 6 September.
However, he appears to have died in 496, not 497 as given by some sources.

Remains

Samuel Lewis in his Topographical Dictionary of Ireland (1837) describes Lusk as "chiefly distinguished as the site of a monastery, over which St. Macculind, styled indifferently abbot or bishop, presided until his death in 497."
Lusk takes its name from the Irish Lusca, meaning "vault".
The huge vault is below the round tower of Lusk, and holds the body of St. Macculindus, buried around 496, and about 18 bishops who succeeded him.
The tower itself has six stories, each reached from below by an iron ladder.

In Scotland the parish of Macalan or Macallan, was named after him.
By 1872 the former parish of Macalen or Macalland had been annexed to Knockandu.

Notes

Citations

Sources

 

 
 
 

Medieval saints of Leinster
496 deaths